The 2004–05 season was Swansea City Association Football Club's 27th season in the newly formed Football League Two, and their 76th in English football. Alan Curtis had left the club early before the season's start, with Kenny Jackett replacing him. Swansea City gained promotion by finishing in third place. In the cup competitions, they reached the third round of the FA Cup, having defeated Cheltenham Town and Stockport County, before losing 2–1 on aggregate against Reading. A 3–0 loss against Queens Park Rangers saw Swansea exit in the first round of the League Cup. They were eliminated in the second round of the Football League Trophy, but reached the final in the FAW Premier Cup, beating Wrexham 2–1.

Lee Trundle was the club's top goalscorer with 23 goals in all competitions.

Players

Squad information

Transfers

In

Out

Out on loan

Matches

League table

Results summary

Results by round

Club

Coaching staff

Pre-season

Football League Two

FA Cup

League Cup

Football League Trophy

References

External links
Swansea City 2004–05  on statto.com

2004-05
2004–05 Football League Two by team
Welsh football clubs 2004–05 season